Cheng Siu-keung (born July 21, 1952), also credited as Alan Cheng or Milo Cheng, is a Hong Kong cinematographer, screenwriter, and director. He is known for frequently collaborating with directors Johnnie To and Wai Ka-Fai as a cinematographer for their independent film production company, Milkyway Image.

Filmography

As cinematographer

 Unfaithfully Yours (1989)
 Happy Together (1989)
 Middle Man (1990)
 The Figures from Earth (1990)
 A Bite of Love (1990)
 Fight Back to School (1991)
 Inspector Pink Dragon (1991)
 Hidden Desire (1991)
 What a Hero! (1992)
 Black Cat II (1992)
 Fight Back to School II (1992)
 Zen of Sword (1992)
 White Lotus Cult (1993)
 Murder (1993)
 Sam the Iron Bridge -- Champion of Martial Arts (1993)
 One Arm Hero (1994)
 Return to a Better Tomorrow (1994)
 Whatever You Want (1994)
 The Great Conqueror's Concubine (1994)
 Thunderbolt (1995)
 Loving You (1995)
 The Meaning of Life (1995)
 Teenage Master (1995)
 Beyond Hypothermia (1996)
 Satan Returns (1996)
 Intruder (1997)
 Lifeline (1997)
 The Odd One Dies (1997)
 A Hero Never Dies (1998)
 The Lucky Guy (1998)
 A True Mob Story (1998)
 The Longest Nite (1998)
 Tales in the Wind (1998)
 Where A Good Man Goes (1999)
 Running Out of Time (1999)
 The Mission (1999)
 Okinawa: Rendez-vous (2000)
 Twelve Nights (2000)
 Needing You... (2000)
 Help!!! (2000)
 Fulltime Killer (2001)
 Wu yen (2001)
 The Loser's Club (2001)
 Running Out of Time 2 (2001)
 Love On a Diet (2001)
 My Left Eye Sees Ghosts (2002)
 Fat Choi Spirit (2002)
 Love For All Seasons (2003)
 Running on Karma (2003)
 PTU (2003)
 Turn Left, Turn Right (2003)
 Breaking News (2004)
 Yesterday Once More (2004)
 Throw Down (2004)
 Dumplings (2004)
 Election (2005)
 Exiled (2006)
 Election 2 (2006)
 Mad Detective (2007)
 Triangle (2007)
 Linger (2008)
 Sparrow (2008)
 Vengeance (2009)
 Death of a Hostage (2010)
 Life Without Principle (2011)
 Don't Go Breaking My Heart (2011)
 Romancing in Thin Air (2012)
 Drug War (2012)
 Blind Detective (2013)
 The Way We Dance (2013)
 Doomsday Party (2013)
 Twilight Online (2014)	 	 
 Imprisoned: Survival Guide for Rich and Prodigal (2015)	 	 
 Office (2015)	 	 
 Get Outta Here (2015)	 	 
 Blood of Youth (2016)	 	 
 Three (2016)	 	 
 Keep Calm and Be a Superstar (2018)	 	 
 Monster Hunt 2 (2018)	 	 
 Invincible Dragon (2019)	 	 
 Ip Man 4: The Finale (2019)	 	 
 Limbo (2021)	 	 
 A Murder Erased (2022)	 	 
 Detective vs. Sleuths'' (2022)

Nominations

External links
 
 Hong Kong Movie Database

Hong Kong people
Living people
Hong Kong film directors
Hong Kong cinematographers
1952 births